Young Labour or Young Labor can refer to several youth organizations of Labour Parties.

Australian Young Labor, youth wing of the Australian Labor Party
New Zealand Young Labour, youth wing of the New Zealand Labour Party
Scottish Young Labour, youth wing of the Scottish Labour Party
Young Labour (UK), youth wing of the United Kingdom Labour Party
Young Labor (Mauritius), youth wing of the Mauritian Labour Party

See also
 Labour Youth, the youth wing of the Irish Labour Party
 Labour Youth Forum, the youth wing of the Malta Labour Party
 Young Labour League, a name used by at least three organisations in Australia, United Kingdom and Ireland